The 1947 Sugar Bowl was played between the third-ranked Georgia Bulldogs and the ninth-ranked North Carolina Tar Heels. Georgia won 20–10.

In the second quarter, North Carolina scored on a four-yard Walt Pupa touchdown run to take a 7–0 halftime lead. In the third quarter, Georgia scored on a 4-yard touchdown run by John Rauch to tie the game at 7. North Carolina's Fox kicked a 27-yard field goal as North Carolina led 10–7. Georgia scored on a 67-yard touchdown pass from Charley Trippi to Dan Edwards to take a 13–10 lead. In the fourth quarter, Rauch scored on a 13-yard touchdown to seal the Georgia victory 20–10.

References

Sugar Bowl
Sugar Bowl
Georgia Bulldogs football bowl games
North Carolina Tar Heels football bowl games
Sugar Bowl
Sugar Bowl